"A Good Night" is a song by American singer-songwriter John Legend. It was written by Raye, Sasha Sloan, and BloodPop and produced by BloodPop. Released as a single by John Legend Music and Columbia Records on April 6, 2018, it reached number seven on the US Billboard Adult R&B Songs.

Music video
An accompanying music video was directed by Mishka Kornai. Produced by Ryan Huffman for Whitelist.tv in conjunction with Google, it was captured entirely on 23 Google Pixel 2 smartphones. Legend commented that "the song and the video are about a magical night where you meet someone you immediately connect with and can envision a future together [...] You’re single, dating, probably using all the apps people use now (I haven’t dated since the advent of Tinder, etc, but it’s a fascinating era in romance), and not finding someone special. But one night – maybe caught up in the music or the drinks or whatever – you meet someone that changes everything."

Track listing

Personnel
Credits adapted from the liner notes of "A Good Night."

Backing vocals  — Raye, Sasha Sloan
Engineer  — Mark "Exit" Goodchild
Guitar  — Johnny Natural
Keyboards, bass  — Ely Rise

Mastering  — Chris Gehringer
Mixing  — John Hanes, Serban Ghenea
Production, drums — BloodPop
Writing  — John Stephens, Michael Diamond, Rachel Keen, Sasha Sloan

Charts

Weekly charts

Year-end charts

References

2018 singles
2018 songs
John Legend songs
BloodPop songs
Songs about nights
Song recordings produced by BloodPop
Songs written by BloodPop
Songs written by John Legend
Songs written by Raye (singer)
Songs written by Sasha Alex Sloan